"Out of Touch" is a song by American duo Hall & Oates from their twelfth studio album Big Bam Boom (1984). The song was released as the lead single from Big Bam Boom on Thursday, October 4, 1984, by RCA Records. This song was their last Billboard Hot 100 number-one single, topping the chart for two weeks in December 1984. It also became the duo's fourteenth consecutive top 40 hit since 1980.

The song often segued from "Dance on Your Knees", which is the opening song of the Big Bam Boom album. The accompanying music video for "Out of Touch", featuring a gigantic drum kit, also contains the "Dance on Your Knees" intro, which segues into an edit of the 12-inch remix version.

According to John Oates, he came up with the chorus while randomly playing around with a synthesizer that he did not know how to use. He thought it could be a song for the Stylistics, having a Philly sound. But in the studio the next day a co-producer told him it should be a hit for Hall & Oates themselves. Oates and Hall then co-wrote the verse.

Track listing and formats
US 7-inch vinyl single
 "Out of Touch" — 3:55
 "Cold, Dark and Yesterday" — 4:35

US 12-inch vinyl single
 "Out of Touch" (Club Version) — 7:36
 "Out of Touch" (Dub Version) — 7:24
 "Cold, Dark and Yesterday" — 4:35

UK 12-inch vinyl single
 "Out of Touch" (Video Mix)
 "Dance on Your Knees" (Extended Mix)
 "Everytime You Go Away" (Remix Version)

Credits
 Daryl Hall – lead vocals and backing vocals, rhythm guitar
 John Oates – synthesizers and backing vocals
 G. E. Smith – lead guitar and backing vocals
 Tom Wolk – bass and backing vocals
 Wells Christy – synthesizer
 Clive Smith – sampler
 Jimmy Bralower – drum machine

Charts

Weekly charts

Year-end charts

Certifications

Uniting Nations version

English dance music act Uniting Nations covered "Out of Touch" and released it as their debut single on November 15, 2004. This version peaked at number seven on the UK Singles Chart in January 2005 and remained in the top 75 for 21 weeks. Elsewhere, the cover reached number one in Romania—where it was the highest-selling single of 2005—and became a top-ten hit in Finland, Ireland, the Netherlands, and Norway. The vocals on the recording were done by vocalist and session artist Jinian Wilde.

Music video
The music video for the song features actors Paul Spicer, Charleene Rena, Hayley-Marie Coppin, Sophie Lovell Anderson, Daniela Martins, a participant of French Big Brother Secret Story, and one unidentified woman playing strip poker.

Track listings
UK CD single
 "Out of Touch" (radio mix) – 2:46
 "Out of Touch" (extended mix) – 6:16
 "Out of Touch" (Skylab Remix) – 7:03
 "Out of Touch" (Tyrrell Remix) – 6:50
 "Out of Touch" (The Vanden Plas Remix) – 7:20
 "Out of Touch" (Paul Roberts Remix) – 6:55
 "Out of Touch" (video)

UK 12-inch single
A1. "Out of Touch" (extended mix) – 6:16
A2. "Out of Touch" (Hardfaze Remix) – 7:55
B1. "Out of Touch" (Skylab Remix) – 7:03
B2. "Out of Touch" (Tyrell Remix) – 6:50

Australian and New Zealand CD single
 "Out of Touch" (Love You So Much radio mix) – 3:31
 "Out of Touch" (extended mix) – 6:16
 "Out of Touch" (radio edit with Vox filter intro) – 2:46
 "Out of Touch" (Skylab Remix) – 7:03
 "Out of Touch" (Outsiderz Remix) – 7:05
 "Out of Touch" (Paul Roberts Remix) – 6:55

Charts

Weekly charts

Year-end charts

Certifications

Release history

See also
 List of Romanian Top 100 number ones of the 2000s
 List of Billboard Hot 100 singles of 1984
 List of number-one dance singles of 1984 (U.S.)

References

External links
 Video on VH1 Classic (Listed as "No longer available" prior to 3/10)

1984 singles
1984 songs
2004 debut singles
Billboard Hot 100 number-one singles
Hall & Oates songs
Number-one singles in Romania
RCA Records singles
Song recordings produced by Bob Clearmountain
Songs written by Daryl Hall
Songs written by John Oates
UK Independent Singles Chart number-one singles
Uniting Nations songs
Internet memes introduced in 2019